The year 1707 in science and technology involved some significant events.

Geophysics
 May 23 – Volcanic eruption in the Santorini caldera begins.
 October 28 – The Hōei earthquake ruptures all segments of the Nankai megathrust simultaneously – the only earthquake known to have done this. It is the most powerful in Japan until 2011, with an estimated local magnitude of 8.6.
 December 16 – Hōei eruption, the last eruption of Mount Fuji in Japan, begins.

Mathematics
 Publication of Arithmetica universalis, the collected works of Isaac Newton on algebra.
 Abraham de Moivre derives de Moivre's formula.

Medicine
 John Floyer, in The Physician's Pulse Watch, introduces counting of pulse rate during one minute.
 Giovanni Maria Lancisi publishes De Subitaneis Mortibus (On Sudden Death), an early work in cardiology.
 Georg Ernst Stahl publishes .

Births
 January 11 – Vincenzo Riccati, Italian mathematician (died 1775)
 April 10 – John Pringle, Scottish physician (died 1782)
 April 15 – Leonhard Euler, Swiss mathematician (died 1783)
 May 23 – Carl Linnaeus, Swedish naturalist (died 1778)
 June 22 (bapt.) – Elizabeth Blackwell, Scottish-born botanical illustrator (died 1758)
 September 7 – Georges-Louis Leclerc, Comte de Buffon, French naturalist (died 1788)
 December 22 – Johann Amman (died 1741), Swiss-Russian botanist.
 date unknown – Benjamin Robins, English scientist and engineer (died 1751)

Deaths
 March 30 – Marquis de Vauban, French military engineer (born 1633)
 Maria Clara Eimmart, German astronomer, engraver and designer  (born 1676)

 
18th century in science
1700s in science